The Kadleroshilik River is a  stream in the North Slope Borough of the U.S. state of Alaska. It was named by Ernest de Koven Leffingwell for the nearby Kadleroshilik Pingo, the highest known pingo in the world, which Leffingwell also named.

A fish study conducted by the Alaska Department of Fish and Game in 1995 reported Arctic grayling (Thymallus arcticus), Dolly Varden trout (Salvelinus malma), and ninespine stickleback (Pungitius pungitius) in the river. An earlier study had also reported the presence of slimy sculpin (Cottus cognatus).

References

Rivers of North Slope Borough, Alaska
Rivers of Alaska